Joel Patrick Dommett (born 8 June 1985) is an English actor, author, comedian, and television presenter. He is known for his television roles in Live in Chelsea, Impractical Jokers UK,  I'm a Celebrity...Get Me Out of Here!, Joel & Nish vs The World and from 2020 onwards has been the host of The Masked Singer UK.

Early life
Dommett is originally from Rockhampton, Gloucestershire and attended The Castle School in Thornbury. As a teenager he was a member of a nu metal band called Psirus, which played five shows. He moved to London at the age of 19.

Career
Before standup comedy, Dommett did some minor acting roles such as the roles of Josh in Teenage Kicks (2008), Jonathon Hansel in Casualty (2004) and Dale in The Golden Hour (2005). In 2005 and in 2007 respectively, Dommett acted in the Rikki Beadle Blair plays Bashment and Stonewall. 

His first stand-up gig was at a bar in Los Angeles, and he has since performed in locations including Reykjavik, Gravesend and The Netherlands. In 2008, he won Best Newcomer award and was a finalist in Stand Up Comedian of the year. He would be an unknown comedian until his appearance on the Comedy current affairs show Russell Howard's Good News in April 2011. In his appearance, Dommett performed standup towards the end of the show in the standup section. 

In 2008, he appeared in a feature film, The Edge of Love, as a train soldier who featured briefly in a scene.

In 2009, he was a co-host on Paul Foot's podcast from episode 1–20. Dommett is a member of the National Youth Theatre.

In 2010, Dommett appeared in a recurring role in E4's Skins as D.C. Sweeney and appeared in all six episodes of Popatron, a sitcom produced by Charlie Brooker's Zeppotron that appeared on BBC Two as part of its BBC Switch brand. Beginning in 2011, Dommett hosted Live in Chelsea, a live discussion show revolving around the events of the popular reality show Made in Chelsea. Dommett appeared in the first two series of Impractical Jokers UK from 2012 until 2014 on BBC Three.

In 2015, Dommett was a team captain on ITV2's comedy show Reality Bites. He was also a regular panellist on Nicole Scherzinger's team on the Sky 1 panel show Bring the Noise. In November 2015, Dommett appeared on a celebrity edition of The Chase. 

In 2016, Dommett was cast in the Fulwell 73 film White Island, based on Colin Butt's novel, A Bus Could Run You Over. He played the character of Dexter Ward, a DJ and friend of the protagonist, who is arrested for drug possession in Ibiza. The film was not a commercial success.

In November 2016, Dommett took part in the sixteenth series of I'm a Celebrity...Get Me Out of Here! and finished in second place, losing out to Gogglebox'''s Scarlett Moffatt.

In 2018, Dommett released his first book of memoirs, It's Not Me It's Them: Confessions of a hopeless modern romantic. The book details his romantic encounters with 40 women before meeting his now wife, Hannah Cooper, and has the running narrative that he is on his first date with her and is recalling the women that he had relationships with. Towards the final page of the book, Dommett asks Cooper whether she would want to marry him. 

From November 2017 until December 2019, Dommett co-presented I'm a Celebrity: Extra Camp on ITV2. The aftershow was axed in January 2020 due to it becoming too expensive to film. 

In 2019, Dommett began presenting the quiz show Hey Tracey alongside Donna Preston, who plays the computer-generated 'Tracey' and the reality dating show Singletown alongside Emily Atack, both on ITV2. Singletown only lasted one series whereas it has not been announced whether Hey Tracey would have a third series following its second filmed during the COVID 19 pandemic. 

On 9 September 2019, Dommett was announced as the presenter for ITV's The Masked Singer, the UK version of the international music game show Masked Singer, which began airing on 4 January 2020. Dommett also hosts the sister show The Masked Dancer, which premiered in May 2021.

In 2020, Dommett was scheduled to go on tour across the UK in his Unapologetic: (If That Is Ok?) stand-up comedy tour, although that was postponed to 2021 to 2022 if no further restrictions are imposed. Only a few shows in February and early March were performed before a nationwide March lockdown was imposed; the show has the theme of Dommett being newly married and his newfound primetime television presenting roles.

On 9 September 2021, Dommett hosted the 2021 National Television Awards ceremony. He was on the long list for the best presenter award, but failed to make the final shortlist.

In February 2023, it was confirmed that he would present the BBC's revival of Survivor''.

Personal life
Dommett married Hannah Cooper in 2019. They began dating in 2016 after she sent him a "cat with the heart eye emoji" (😻) in an Instagram direct message.

In April 2022, Dommett and Cooper started their podcast on Global Player titled "Never Have I Ever". The podcast show provides the couple an opportunity to try out activities they would never have had the chance to do. Activities featured on the podcast have included blood donation, puppy yoga, experiencing a sensory deprivation tank and open water swimming.

Filmography

Film and theatre

Television

References

External links
Official website

Chortle profile page and tour dates
Digital Spy interview
BBC Impractical Jokers profile
Official Home

1985 births
Living people
21st-century English male actors
English male comedians
English male film actors
English male television actors
English television presenters
I'm a Celebrity...Get Me Out of Here! (British TV series) participants
Male actors from Gloucestershire
National Youth Theatre members
People educated at The Castle School
People from Rockhampton